John Hamilton, comte de Hamilton (1651 – 1691), was an Irish army officer of Scottish origin, who fought in the Williamite war in Ireland on the side of the deposed James II. He died from wounds received at the Battle of Aughrim.

Birth and origins 
John Hamilton was born around the time his family fled Ireland to Caen, France in 1651,. He was the sixth and youngest son of George Hamilton and his wife, Mary Butler. His father was Scottish, the fourth son of James Hamilton, 1st Earl of Abercorn, and would in 1660 be created baronet of Donalong and Nenagh.

His mother was Irish, the third daughter of Thomas Butler, Viscount Thurles, and a sister of the future 1st Duke of Ormond. She was a member of the Butler dynasty, an Old English family that descended from Theobald Walter, who had been appointed Chief Butler of Ireland by King Henry II in 1177. His parents had married in 1629. John had eight siblings, who are listed in his father's article. 

Both his parents were Catholic, but some relatives on his father's as on his mother's side were Protestants.

His grandfather, James Hamilton, 1st Earl of Abercorn, was a Protestant, but his father and all his paternal uncles were raised as Catholics due to the influence of his paternal grandmother, Marion Boyd, a recusant. Some branches of the Hamilton family were Protestant, such as that of his father's second cousin Gustavus (1642–1723), who would become the 1st Viscount Boyne.

His mother's family, the Butlers, were generally Catholic with the notable exception of the future 1st Duke of Ormond, his maternal uncle. His eldest brother, James, would turn Protestant when marrying Elizabeth Colepeper in 1661, and his son, also called James Hamilton, would fight on the other side during the Siege of Derry. His brother Thomas seems to have made the same choice as he became a captain in the Royal Navy.

Early life 
His father was a soldier in the Irish army and fought for the royalists under his uncle James Butler, the Earl of Ormond, in the Irish Confederate Wars (1641–1648) and the Cromwellian conquest of Ireland (1649-1653). Early in 1651 his family followed Ormond into French exile. His mother brought him along as an infant, first to Caen where they were accommodated for some time by Elizabeth Preston, the Marchioness of Ormond, later Elizabeth Butler, Duchess of Ormond. From there his mother brought him along with her to Paris where she lived in the convent of the Feuillantines together with her sister Eleanor, Lady Muskerry, the wife of Donough Maccarty, 2nd Viscount Muskerry, later Earl Clancarty.

Restoration 
He and his family returned to London in 1660 after the English Restoration. Their Irish estates were returned to them and his father was created Baronet Donalong in 1660 by Charles II.

James II 
John Hamilton became an officer in James II's Royal Irish Army, as did his older brothers, Anthony and Richard. He stayed loyal to James at the 1688 Glorious Revolution. He seems to have gone into French exile with the King as he landed with him at Kinsale on 12 March 1689, having sailed on the ship-of-the-line Entreprenant. By June 1690 he was ranked brigadier, and was listed as one of the "Directors" left in Ireland by Tyrconnell when the latter travelled to France following the defeat at the Boyne.

During the 1691 campaign in Ireland, Hamilton was involved in the Siege of Athlone, where he attempted to retake the city with two infantry brigades but failed. He was subsequently in command of the second line of infantry at the Battle of Aughrim. Seriously wounded, he was taken prisoner late in the day and died in Dublin shortly afterwards.

Marriage and daughter 
In 1690, Hamilton married Elizabeth Macan (or, likely, McCann) of the family of the ancient Irish Lords of Clanbrassil, different from the viscounts and earls of Clanbrassill, who were Hamiltons from Scotland. The couple had a daughter Margaret, who married a Comte de Marmier in France.

Aughrim, death, and timeline 
During the 1691 campaign in Ireland, Hamilton was involved in the Siege of Athlone in June, where he attempted to retake the city with two infantry brigades but failed.

On 12 July 1691 at the Battle of Aughrim, he commanded the second line of infantry. Seriously wounded, he was taken prisoner late in the day and died in Dublin shortly afterwards.

Notes and references

Notes

Citations

Sources 

 
 
  (for John)
 
 
  – Ab-Adam to Basing
  – England
  – Scotland and Ireland
 }
  – (for timeline)
 
 
  
  – Irish stem

1650s births
1691 deaths
Date of birth unknown
Irish generals
Irish people of Scottish descent
Irish soldiers in the army of James II of England
Jacobite military personnel of the Williamite War in Ireland
Place of birth unknown
Younger sons of baronets